Love Lake (also called Love Lake City) is an unincorporated community in Macon County, in the U.S. state of Missouri.

History
Love Lake was platted in 1868 by James M. Love, and named for him. A post office called Love Lake City was established in 1870, the name was changed to Love Lake in 1886, and the post office closed in 1919.

References

Unincorporated communities in Macon County, Missouri
Unincorporated communities in Missouri